Kingston was launched in 1806 and spent her career trading primarily between England and the West Indies, though also trading with Sicily, America, and India, and possibly Russia. Her crew abandoned her in 1819 when she developed a leak.

Career
Kingston enters the Register of Shipping and Lloyd's Register with slightly inconsistent information. Discrepancies between the two registers appear several times, probably reflecting differences in the dates of the information and in publication, stale information, and possibly error.

Fate
Lloyd's List reported on 3 December 1819 that Kingston, Horncastle, master, had sprung a leak while sailing from Honduras to London. The crew abandoned her in the Gulf of Florida.

Citations and references
Citations

References

1806 ships
Ships built in Whitby
Age of Sail merchant ships
Merchant ships of the United Kingdom
Maritime incidents in 1819